The canton of Grand Bourgtheroulde (before March 2020: canton of Bourgtheroulde-Infreville) is an administrative division of the Eure department, northern France. Its borders were modified at the French canton reorganisation which came into effect in March 2015. Its seat is in Grand Bourgtheroulde.

It consists of the following communes:

Amfreville-Saint-Amand
Le Bec-Thomas
Boissey-le-Châtel
Bosroumois
Flancourt-Crescy-en-Roumois
Fouqueville
Grand Bourgtheroulde
La Harengère
La Haye-du-Theil
Les Monts du Roumois
Saint-Cyr-la-Campagne
Saint-Denis-des-Monts
Saint-Didier-des-Bois
Saint-Germain-de-Pasquier
Saint-Léger-du-Gennetey
Saint-Ouen-de-Pontcheuil
Saint-Ouen-du-Tilleul
Saint-Philbert-sur-Boissey
Saint-Pierre-des-Fleurs
Saint-Pierre-du-Bosguérard
La Saussaye
Thénouville
Le Thuit-de-l'Oison
Tourville-la-Campagne
Voiscreville

References

Cantons of Eure